Abdul Wali Kakar (Urdu: عبدالولی کاکڑ)  is a Pakistani politician, currently serving as the Governor of Balochistan since 3 March 2023. Kakr is a member of the Balochistan National Party (Mengal) party. He is the senior vice president of the Balochistan National Party (Mengal) party.

References

External links 
 

Governors of Balochistan, Pakistan
Pakistani Muslims
Living people